The Essex Institute (1848–1992) in Salem, Massachusetts, was "a literary, historical and scientific society." It maintained a museum, library, historic houses; arranged educational programs; and issued numerous scholarly publications. In 1992 the institute merged with the Peabody Museum of Salem to form the Peabody Essex Museum.

On December 8, 2017, much to the dismay of Salem residents, Dan L. Monroe, PEM’s Rose-Marie and Eijk van Otterloo Director and CEO, issued a press release announcing that the 42,000 linear feet of historical documents will be permanently relocated to Rowley, MA and Plummer Hall and Daland House, the two historic buildings which had housed the Phillips Library, will be utilized as office and meeting space.

History
The Essex Institute was "formed by the union of the Essex Historical Society and the Essex County Natural History Society." Daniel Appleton White, the former Judge of Probate for Essex County, was appointed in 1848 as the first president of the institute until his death in 1861. Around 1879 the institute housed its "scientific collections" in Salem's East India Marine Hall and its library in Plummer Hall. According to an 1880 travel guide, "its objects are general and varied. Perhaps the most important is that of local historical discoveries and the preservation of everything relating to Essex County history."

In addition to operating a library and museum, the institute arranged educational programs. In the 1880s, for example: "1. Every winter season lectures are given to an almost unlimited extent. Besides a regular course on general subjects, several courses are given on special subjects — Literature, History, Languages, Travel, the Sciences — and various papers are read before the regular meetings. 2. A regular course of musical entertainments is given every season, besides which there are several miscellaneous concerts. 3. Art exhibitions are given once or twice each year, at which are exhibited paintings, statuary, decorations, fancy work and the like by Essex county people. Also, exhibitions of horticulture and agriculture. 4. During the summer season a half dozen "field meetings" are held in different parts of the county. At these meetings addresses are made on the local history of the place visited, and on its flora and geology. In addition, it is customary to have one or more distinguished scientists or historians to speak on a specially assigned topic."

By the 1930s the institute owned "two fine Samuel McIntire houses in Salem - the Peirce-Nichols House, built in 1782, and the Gardner-Pingree House, built in 1804, both ... open to the public."

Images

See also
 Peabody Essex Museum, successor to the Essex Institute (1992)

References

Further reading

Issued by the institute
 Proceedings of the Essex Institute. 1848-1868
 Act of incorporation, constitution and by-laws of the Essex Institute, incorporated February, 1848: With a catalogue of the officers and members. W. Ives and G.W. Pease, Printers, 1855
 Essex Institute Historical Collections. 1859-1993
 Bulletin of the Essex Institute. 1869-1898
 "Essex Institute," in: Charles Stuart Osgood, Henry Morrill Batchelder. Historical sketch of Salem, 1626-1879. Salem: Essex Institute, 1879 
 Annual report of the Essex Institute. 1899-1960

About the institute
 essex institute, in: griffin. "bibliography of historical societies of the united states and british america." Annual report of the American Historical Association, 1892. Smithsonian Institution Press, 1893
 
 
 Howard Corning. The Essex Institute of Salem. Bulletin of the Business Historical Society, Vol. 7, No. 5 (Oct., 1933), pp. 1–5
 Norman R. Bennett, George E. Brooks, Alan R. Booth. Materials for African History in the Peabody Museum and Essex Institute. African Studies Bulletin, Vol. 5, No. 3 (Oct., 1962), pp. 13–22
 Robert P. Spindler, Gregor Trinkaus-Randall, Prudence Backman. Format for Cooperation: Cooperative Collection Registers at the Peabody Museum of Salem and the Essex Institute. American Archivist, Vol. 51, No. 1/2 (Winter - Spring, 1988), pp. 115–119

External links

 Digital Public Library of America. Items related to Essex Institute, various dates

1848 establishments in Massachusetts
Libraries in Essex County, Massachusetts
Museums in Salem, Massachusetts
Historical societies in Massachusetts
History of Salem, Massachusetts